5-Fluoro-MET (5F-MET, 5-fluoro-N-methyl-N-ethyltryptamine) is a psychedelic tryptamine derivative related to drugs such as 5-Fluoro-DMT and N-Methyl-N-ethyltryptamine (MET). It acts as an agonist at the 5-HT2A receptor with an EC50 of 20.6 nM and produces a head-twitch response in animal studies. Ring fluorination in this case increases efficacy at 5-HT2A, with 5F-MET having an efficacy of 87.6% vs 5-HT, vs 36.2% for the partial agonist MET. It is claimed to have antidepressant activity.

See also
 5-Fluoro-AMT
 5-Fluoro-AET
 5-Fluoro-DET
 5-Fluoro-EPT
 5-MeO-MET
 7-F-5-MeO-MET

References 

Psychedelic tryptamines
Tryptamines
Fluoroarenes